Georgios Kontogiannis (born 1899, date of death unknown) was a Greek sports shooter. He competed in the 50 m pistol event at the 1936 Summer Olympics.

References

1899 births
Year of death missing
Greek male sport shooters
Olympic shooters of Greece
Shooters at the 1936 Summer Olympics
Place of birth missing
20th-century Greek people